Neodiplotrema is a genus of flatworms belonging to the family Didymozoidae.

Species:

Neodiplotrema pelamydis

References

Platyhelminthes